Ashley Peter Foyle (born 17 September 1986) is an English football defender who plays for Northern Premier League Premier Division side Worksop Town F.C. after joining from near neighbours Matlock Town F.C. on the second of September 2009.

He signed for Accrington in August 2006, leaving his only previous professional club, Chesterfield. From there he went on loan to Belper Town and then signed for Northern Premier League First Division winners Buxton F.C. in 2007. Before joining rivals Matlock Town F.C. where he then went off to current club Worksop Town F.C. In July 2013 he started playing with Staveley Miners Welfare FC.

External links

Living people
1986 births
English footballers
Chesterfield F.C. players
Accrington Stanley F.C. players
Buxton F.C. players
Belper Town F.C. players
Lincoln United F.C. players
Matlock Town F.C. players
English Football League players
Worksop Town F.C. players
Association football defenders